Nepenthes × hookeriana (after Joseph Dalton Hooker), or Hooker's pitcher-plant, is a common natural hybrid involving N. ampullaria and N. rafflesiana. It was originally described as a species.

It is a relatively common natural hybrid found throughout the lowlands of Borneo, Peninsular Malaysia, Singapore, and Sumatra. It is also present on smaller surrounding islands such as Natuna. Like its parental species, the hybrid generally grows in recently disturbed clearings.

Infraspecific taxa
Nepenthes hookeri var. elongata Hort.Veitch ex Wilson (1877) sphalm.typogr.
Nepenthes hookeriana f. elongata (Hort.Veitch ex Wilson) Divers (1879)

References

Further reading

 [Anonymous] 1848. New garden plants, published in books. The Gardeners' Chronicle and Agricultural Gazette 1848(6): 87. 
 [Anonymous] 1881. Messrs. Veitch's Nepenthes-house. The Gardeners' Chronicle, new series, 16(410): 598–599. 
 [Anonymous] 1883. Mr. A. E. Ratcliff's Nepenthes. The Gardeners' Chronicle 20(497): 18–19.
 [Anonymous] 1887. Nepenthes culture. The Gardeners' Chronicle, series 3, 2(41): 442–443.
 Adam, J.H., C.C. Wilcock & M.D. Swaine 1992.  Journal of Tropical Forest Science 5(1): 13–25.
 Adam, J.H. 1997.  Pertanika Journal of Tropical Agricultural Science 20(2–3): 121–134.
 Adam, J.H. & C.C. Wilcock 1999.  Pertanika Journal of Tropical Agricultural Science 22(1): 1–7.
 Bednar, B.L. 1985.  Carnivorous Plant Newsletter 14(4): 105–106.
 Brearley, F.Q. & M. Mansur 2012. Nutrient stoichiometry of Nepenthes species from a Bornean peat swamp forest. Carnivorous Plant Newsletter 41(3): 105–108.
 Burbidge, F.W. 1882. Notes on the new Nepenthes. The Gardeners' Chronicle, new series, 17(420): 56.
 Clarke, C.M. 1997. Nepenthes of Borneo. Natural History Publications (Borneo), Kota Kinabalu.
 Clarke, C.M. 2002. A Guide to the Pitcher Plants of Peninsular Malaysia.  Natural History Publications (Borneo), Kota Kinabalu.
 Clarke, C.M. 2006. Introduction. In: Danser, B.H. The Nepenthaceae of the Netherlands Indies. Natural History Publications (Borneo), Kota Kinabalu. pp. 1–15.
 Dixon, W.E. 1889. Nepenthes. The Gardeners' Chronicle, series 3, 6(144): 354.
  Handayani, T. 1999.  [Conservation of Nepenthes in Indonesian botanic gardens.] In: A. Mardiastuti, I. Sudirman, K.G. Wiryawan, L.I. Sudirman, M.P. Tampubolon, R. Megia & Y. Lestari (eds.) Prosiding II: Seminar Hasil-Hasil Penelitian Bidang Ilmu Hayat. Pusat Antar Universitas Ilmu Hayat IPB, Bogor. pp. 365–372.
 Handayani, T., D. Latifah & Dodo 2005. Diversity and growth behaviour of Nepenthes (pitcher plants) in Tanjung Puting National Park, Central Kalimantan Province. Biodiversitas 6(4): 248–252 .  Cover 
 Hwee, K.C. 1996. Carnivorous plants and sites in Singapore. Bulletin of the Australian Carnivorous Plant Society, Inc. 15(4): 12–15.
  Mansur, M. 2001.  In: Prosiding Seminar Hari Cinta Puspa dan Satwa Nasional. Lembaga Ilmu Pengetahuan Indonesia, Bogor. pp. 244–253.
  Mansur, M. 2007. Keanekaragaman jenis Nepenthes (kantong semar) dataran rendah di Kalimantan Tengah. [Diversity of lowland Nepenthes (kantong semar) in Central Kalimantan.] Berita Biologi 8(5): 335–341. Abstract
  Mansur, M. 2008. Penelitian ekologi Nepenthes di Laboratorium Alam Hutan Gambut Sabangau Kereng Bangkirai Kalimantan Tengah. [Ecological studies on Nepenthes at Peat Swamps Forest Natural Laboratory, Kereng Bangkirai Sabangau, Central Kalimantan.] Jurnal Teknologi Lingkungan 9(1): 67–73. Abstract 
 Moore, D. 1872. On the culture of Nepenthes at Glasnevin. The Gardeners' Chronicle and Agricultural Gazette 1872(11): 359–360.
  Rahim, S.A., T. Lihan, M. Baba, A. Laming, Z.A. Rahman, W.M.R. Idris, M.B. Gasim, A. Hashim, S.M. Yusof & L.H. Yin 2008. Pengambilan logam berat oleh Nepenthes gracilis dan N. Hookeriana dalam tanih bekas lombong besi dan timah, Pelepah Kanan, Kota Tinggi, Johor. [Heavy metal uptake by Nepenthes gracilis and N. Hookeriana in ex-iron and tin mine soil, Pelepah Kanan, Kota Tinggi, Johor.] Sains Malaysiana 37(1): 39–49. Abstract
 Shivas, R.G. 1984. Pitcher Plants of Peninsular Malaysia & Singapore. Maruzen Asia, Kuala Lumpur.
 Slack, A. 1979. Nepenthes x hookeriana. In: Carnivorous Plants. Ebury Press, London. p. 84.
 Teo, L.L. 2001. Study of natural hybridisation in some tropical plants using amplified fragment length polymorphism analysis. M.Sc. thesis, Nanyang Technological University, Singapore.
 Turnbull, J. & A. Middleton 1984.   Carnivorous Plant Newsletter 13(3): 61–67.
 Yulita, K.S. & M. Mansur 2012. The occurrence of hybrid in Nepenthes hookeriana Lindl. from Central Kalimantan can be detected by RAPD and ISSR markers. HAYATI Journal of Biosciences 19(1): 18–24. 
 James Wong and the Malaysian Garden. [video] BBC Two.

Carnivorous plants of Asia
hookeriana
Flora of Borneo
Flora of Malaya
Flora of Sumatra